Lilia Katri Moritz Schwarcz  is a Brazilian historian and anthropologist. She is a doctor in social anthropology at the University of São Paulo, full professor at the Faculdade de Filosofia, Letras e Ciências Humanas in the same institution, and visiting professor (Global Scholar) at Princeton University.

Her main fields of study are anthropology and history of 19th-century Brazil, focusing on the Brazilian Empire, social identity, slavery and race relations between White and Afro-Brazilian peoples.

Schwarcz is Jewish. In 1986, she co-founded the Companhia das Letras publishing house with her husband Luis Schwarcz. She is a curator for the São Paulo Museum of Art, and writes a column at the news website .

Bibliography 
 Retrato em branco e negro: jornais, escravos e cidadãos em São Paulo no fim do século XIX. Companhia das Letras, 1987. 
 *
 As Barbas do Imperador (English edition:The Emperor's Beard: Dom Pedro II and His Tropical Monarchy in Brazil. Hill and Wang, 2003. )
 O Império em Procissão - Zahar, 2000.  
 A Longa Viagem da Biblioteca dos Reis - Do terremoto de Lisboa à Independência do Brasil. Companhia das Letras, 2002. 
 O Sol do Brasil: Nicolas-Antoine Taunay e as Desventuras Dos Artistas Franceses na Corte de D. João 1816-1821. Companhia das Letras, 2008.  - Prêmio Jabuti - Melhor Biografia 2009
 D. João Carioca - A corte portuguesa chega ao Brasil 1808-1821. Companhia das Letras, 2008. 
 Um enigma chamado Brasil (Org. com André Botelho). Companhia das Letras, 2009.  - Prêmio Jabuti - Ciências Sociais 2010
 Agenda brasileira (Org. com André Botelho). Companhia das Letras, 2011. 
 História do Brasil Nação Vol. 3 - A abertura para o mundo 1889-1930 (Org. do volume e Diretora da Coleção). Objetiva, 2012. 
 Nem preto nem branco, muito pelo contrário. Claro Enigma (Companhia das Letras), 2012. 
 A batalha do Avaí - a beleza da barbárie: a Guerra do Paraguai pintada por Pedro Américo. Rio de Janeiro, Sextante. 2013. 
 Brasil: uma Biografia (co-written with Heloisa Murgel Starling). Companhia das Letras. 2015.  (English edition: Brazil, a Biography. Penguin Books, 2018)
 
Lima Barreto: Triste Visionário. Companhia das Letras, 2017. 
Dicionário da Escravidão e Liberdade (organizer, with Flávio dos Santos Gomes). Companhia das Letras, 2018.

References

External links 
Lilia Moritz Schwarcz official site
Lilia Moritz Schwarcz profile on University of São Paulo Department of Anthropology

Brazilian anthropologists
Brazilian women anthropologists
Brazilian publishers (people)
Academic staff of the University of São Paulo
Living people
20th-century Brazilian historians
Women historians
Internet activists
Year of birth missing (living people)
21st-century Brazilian historians